Nusam Island is an island in Papua New Guinea located in Milne Bay.

 north-east is Kudul Point.

References

Islands of Milne Bay Province